Bruce Ben Robison (born June 11, 1966) is an American, Austin-based Texas country music singer-songwriter.  Bruce and his brother, fellow singer-songwriter Charlie Robison, grew up in Bandera, Texas, near San Antonio, and he currently resides in Austin, Texas.  His self-titled debut album was released in 1995.

Robison has written several songs which have become hits when covered by well-known singers, including: "Travelin' Soldier," (recorded in 2003 by the Dixie Chicks, reached No. 1 on the Country charts); "Angry All the Time," (recorded by Tim McGraw and Faith Hill in 2001, also reached No. 1 on the country charts); and "Wrapped" (recorded in 2006 by George Strait, reached No. 2 in 2007). Bruce runs The Next Waltz, a record label by artists for artists.

Personal life
Sister, Robyn Ludwick, and brother Charlie Robison are accomplished singer-songwriters in their own right.

In 1992, he met singer-songwriter Kelly Willis and they married in 1996. Together they had a son, Deral Otis, in January 2001. Willis became pregnant again and gave birth to twins Abigail Esme and Benjamin James on March 24, 2003. On January 11, 2006, Kelly welcomed fourth child Joseph Willis Robison.

On January 21, 2022 Kelly and Bruce announced their upcoming divorce via their Facebook pages.

Discography

Albums

Music videos

Other contributions
 107.1 KGSR Radio Austin - Broadcasts Vol.10 (2002) – "What Would Willie Do"
 Eklektikos Live (2005) – "Travelin' Soldier"

References

External links
 Official Website

1966 births
Living people
American country singer-songwriters
Musicians from Austin, Texas
American country guitarists
American male guitarists
Country musicians from Texas
Singer-songwriters from Texas
Guitarists from Texas
20th-century American guitarists
People from Bandera, Texas
20th-century American male musicians
American male singer-songwriters